Nikolay Vyacheslavovich Rastorguyev (born February 21, 1957, Lytkarino, Moscow Oblast, Soviet Union)  is the lead singer of the Russian group Lyube.

In 1978, Nikolay was the soloist for the band (VIA in Russian) "Шестеро молодых," but his first note came during his 1980-1985 stint in the band "Лейся, песня (in English, Lyeysya, Pyesnya)." There he befriended Valery Kipelov, who was later to form Aria. After Leysya Pesnya split, Rastorguyev spent a year in the band Rondo before joining newly formed Lyube. Since then, Nikolay remains the band's only permanent member.

He has also starred in a couple of movies and released a solo English language album.

In 1997, Rastorguyev was given the honorary title People's Artist of Russia. On the occasion of his 50th birthday in 2007, Russian President Vladimir Putin awarded Nikolay with the state order "For Merit to the Fatherland," Fourth class. Rastorguyev became a member of the Russian Duma in 2010 as a representative of the ruling party United Russia.

In March 2014, Rastorguyev signed a letter supporting russian occupation of Ukrainian Crimea. For "statements contradicted the interests of our national security" he was then banned from entering Ukraine. In April and May 2022, Rastorguyev participated in a series of concerts organized in order to support the 2022 Russian invasion of Ukraine.

References

External links

Club Torpedo - VIP List of Singers

1957 births
Living people
Anti-Ukrainian sentiment in Russia
People from Ramensky District
Russian musicians
Russian male actors
People's Artists of Russia
Recipients of the Order of Honour (Russia)
United Russia politicians
21st-century Russian politicians
Russian rock singers
Fifth convocation members of the State Duma (Russian Federation)